The Betfair European Tour 2012/2013 – Event 3 (also known as the 2012 Acuerate Antwerp Open and 2012 Belgian Open) was a professional minor-ranking snooker tournament that took place between 17 and 21 October 2012 at the Lotto Arena in Antwerp, Belgium.

Judd Trump was the defending champion, but he lost in the last 64 2–4 against Jack Lisowski.

Mark Allen won his third professional title by defeating Mark Selby 4–1 in the final. Allen made three consecutive century breaks.

Prize fund and ranking points
The breakdown of prize money and ranking points of the event is shown below:

1 Only professional players can earn ranking points.

Main draw

Preliminary rounds

Round 1 
Best of 7 frames

Round 2 
Best of 7 frames

Main rounds

Top half

Section 1

Section 2

Section 3

Section 4

Bottom half

Section 5

Section 6

Section 7

Section 8

Finals

Century breaks

 142, 108, 101  Stuart Bingham
 138  John Astley
 136  Ian Burns
 135  Fergal O'Brien
 131, 116, 101  Mark Selby
 131, 116  Marco Fu
 127  Rod Lawler
 127  Tom Ford
 125, 104, 102, 100  Neil Robertson
 125, 104  Ben Woollaston
 125  Liam Monk
 122, 111, 109, 104  Ali Carter
 118  Marcus Campbell
 117, 106, 105, 102, 100  Mark Allen
 117  Passakorn Suwannawat
 116  Jack Lisowski
 115, 101  Alfie Burden
 115  Gareth Allen
 114, 100  Joe Perry

 113, 106  Michael Holt
 112  Liang Wenbo
 111  Matthew Stevens
 109  Simon Bedford
 107  Thepchaiya Un-Nooh
 106  Michael White
 106  Graeme Dott
 105  Daniel Wells
 104  Jordan Brown
 104  Jamie Burnett
 104  Ding Junhui
 103  Jimmy Robertson
 103  Robbie Williams
 100  Ryan Day
 100  John Higgins
 100  Ricky Walden
 100  Anthony Hamilton
 100  Mark Davis

References

External links

EPTC3Antwerp2012 pictures by MoniqueLimbos at Photobucket

2012
E3
2012 in Belgian sport